The 2005–06 Liga de Honra season was the 16th season of the competition and the 72nd season of recognised second-tier football in Portugal.

Overview
The league was contested by 18 teams with SC Beira-Mar winning the championship and gaining promotion to the Primeira Liga along with CD Aves. At the other end of the table Moreirense FC, SC Covilhã, FC Barreirense, FC Marco, AD Ovarense and FC Maia were relegated to the Segunda Divisão.

League standings

Footnotes

External links
 Portugal 2005/06 - RSSSF (Jorge Santos, Jan Schoenmakers and Daniel Dalence)
 Portuguese II Liga 2005/2006 - footballzz.co.uk

Liga Portugal 2 seasons
2005–06 in European second tier association football leagues
2005–06 in Portuguese football leagues